Giuseppina "Giusy" Leone (born 21 December 1934) is a retired Italian sprinter. She competed in the 100 m, 200 m and 4 × 100 m events at the 1952, 1956 and 1960 Olympics and reached the final on five occasions. In 1960 she won a bronze medal in the 100 m.

Achievements

See also
 Italian Athletics Championships - Multi winners
 Italy national relay team

References

External links
 

1934 births
Sportspeople from Turin
Italian female sprinters
Athletes (track and field) at the 1952 Summer Olympics
Athletes (track and field) at the 1956 Summer Olympics
Athletes (track and field) at the 1960 Summer Olympics
Olympic athletes of Italy
Olympic bronze medalists for Italy
Living people
European Athletics Championships medalists
Medalists at the 1960 Summer Olympics
Olympic bronze medalists in athletics (track and field)
Universiade medalists in athletics (track and field)
Universiade gold medalists for Italy
Universiade silver medalists for Italy
Medalists at the 1959 Summer Universiade
Italian Athletics Championships winners
Olympic female sprinters
20th-century Italian women
21st-century Italian women